Simulated Progress is the second album by Fieldwork, a collective trio consisting of Vijay Iyer on piano, Elliot Humberto Kavee on drums, and Steve Lehman on alto and sopranino saxophone replacing former saxophonist Aaron Stewart, which was recorded in 2004 and released on Pi Recordings.

Reception

In his review for AllMusic, Scott Yanow states "No fireworks occur, the originals are forgettable, and the magic that is necessary to make this type of advanced jazz project a success is lacking."

The JazzTimes review by David R. Adler notes "Fieldwork’s rhythmic logic can be immensely involved, but the results are disarmingly concise. The music is also rich in paradox: dark yet uplifting, intellectually demanding yet effortlessly funky."

The All About Jazz review by Paul Olson states "The greatest compliment that can be paid to Simulated Progress is that there is nothing else out there that sounds like it. This is difficult music. In its risk-taking, fragility, and fearlessness, it's also very thrilling."

Track listing
 "Headlong" (Vijay Iyer) – 4:07
 "Transgression" (Elliot Humberto Kavee) – 5:34 
 "Trips" (Steve Lehman) – 3:57
 "Telematic"  (Vijay Iyer) – 2:42
 "Media Studies" (Steve Lehman) – 5:12
 "Gaudi"  (Elliot Humberto Kavee) – 4:02
 "Transitions"  (Vijay Iyer) – 5:49
 "Peril" (Elliot Humberto Kavee) – 4:49
 "Reprise" (Steve Lehman) – 3:38
 "Infogee Dub" (Vijay Iyer) – 4:29
 "Durations" (Steve Lehman) – 4:36

Personnel
 Vijay Iyer – piano
 Steve Lehman – alto saxophone, sopranino saxophone
 Elliot Humberto Kavee – drums

References

2005 albums
Vijay Iyer albums
Pi Recordings albums